The 1876 United States presidential election in California was held on November 7, 1876, as part of the 1876 United States presidential election. State voters chose six representatives, or electors, to the Electoral College, who voted for president and vice president. 

California narrowly voted for the Republican nominee, Ohio Governor Rutherford B. Hayes, over the Democratic nominee, New York Governor Samuel J. Tilden.

The 1876 election was the closest two-candidate contest in the history of the Electoral College, with Hayes ultimately winning by a single electoral vote following the controversial resolution of disputed returns in other states. Hayes thus needed all six of California's electoral votes to win. While most sources give Hayes' plurality in California as 2,798, at the time Californian voters chose presidential electors individually. In four subsequent presidential elections (1880, 1888, 1896 and 1912), the overall results were sufficiently close that the state split its electoral ticket between two candidates. If this had occurred in 1876, Tilden would have been elected president.

Results

References

California
1876
1876 California elections